Ramona Andra Xavier (born August 19, 1992) is an American electronic musician from Portland, Oregon. She has released music under her primary Vektroid alias, as well as others, such as dstnt, Laserdisc Visions, New Dreams Ltd., Virtual Information Desk, and PrismCorp Virtual Enterprises. Xavier played a prominent role in the popularization of the vaporwave subgenre with the release of her ninth studio album, Floral Shoppe, under the alias Macintosh Plus. The album helped popularize the vaporwave genre throughout the Internet. Since then, she has continued to release music through Bandcamp and other online platforms.

Early life 
Xavier was born in Washington state on August 19, 1992.

Career 
Xavier began producing and releasing electronic music in 2005. She has released music through aliases, including Macintosh Plus, PrismCorp, and Laserdisc Visions, among others. She reports that she has put out over forty releases since 2005. Paolo Scarpa characterized Xavier's music as an "exposé of late capitalism". James Parker noted Vektroid's "sensuous virtuality" and "new cyber-pop unconscious". Writing for Sputnikmusic, Adam Downer called Floral Shoppe a shift toward beauty in an age that has nearly "run the gamut of what artists and musicians can do".

Tiny Mix Tapes ranked Floral Shoppe and 札幌コンテンポラリー, released by Xavier under her Macintosh Plus and 情報デスクVIRTUAL aliases, respectively, on its list of its 50 favorite albums of 2012. Fact magazine called Floral Shoppe the defining album of Bandcamp, the streaming service through which Vektroid releases her music. The album is the site's most user-recommended album in the experimental music category.

Xavier stopped releasing music regularly in early 2013, only releasing two albums of that year, Home™ and ClearSkies™. Both albums were released under the PrismCorp Virtual Enterprises pseudonym in April. In 2014, Xavier released Initiation Tape: Isle of Avalon Edition, a revision of her release Initiation Tape - Part One, as New Dreams Ltd. In early 2015, she collaborated with electronic duo Magic Fades to produce a remix of the song "Ecco" from their debut album, Push Through. In February 2016 she released three albums, Fuji Grid TV EX, Shader Complete and Sleepline. The first two are revisions of some of her albums, while the last one was produced in 2013 but never released previously.

Impact 
Under various aliases, Xavier played a role in the creation of the modern electronic genre vaporwave between 2010 and 2013. Her projects, Macintosh Plus and New Dreams Ltd., are considered as the primary artists in the vaporwave genre.

Personal life 
Xavier now resides in Portland, Oregon. She is a trans woman.

Discography

References

External links

American electronic musicians
1992 births
Living people
Musicians from Washington (state)
American experimental musicians
American women in electronic music
Vaporwave musicians
21st-century American women musicians
American LGBT musicians
LGBT people from Washington (state)
Transgender artists
Transgender women musicians